6th Vancouver Film Critics Circle Awards
February 7, 2006

Best Film: 
 Brokeback Mountain 

Best Canadian Film: 
 C.R.A.Z.Y. 
The 6th Vancouver Film Critics Circle Awards, honoring the best in filmmaking in 2005, were given on 7 February 2006.

Winners

International
Best Actor: 
Philip Seymour Hoffman - Capote
Best Actress: 
Felicity Huffman - Transamerica
Best Director: 
Ang Lee - Brokeback Mountain
Best Film: 
Brokeback Mountain
Best Foreign Language Film: 
Paradise Now, Palestine
Best Supporting Actor: 
Terrence Howard - Crash
Best Supporting Actress: 
Amy Adams - Junebug

Canadian
Best Actor: 
Marc-André Grondin - C.R.A.Z.Y.
Best Actress: 
Lisa Ray - Water
Best British Columbian Film: 
It's All Gone Pete Tong
Best Director:
Deepa Mehta - Water
Best Film: 
C.R.A.Z.Y.
Best Supporting Actor: 
Michel Côté - C.R.A.Z.Y.
Best Supporting Actress: 
Danielle Proulx - C.R.A.Z.Y.

2005
2005 film awards
2005 in British Columbia
2005 in Canadian cinema